Belarus began using its own country code +375 in 1995, replacing the +7 international country code inherited from the Soviet Union. The local numbering plan was inherited from the Soviet Union and remains with few changes.

Geographic area codes were designed based on previous 3-digit USSR area codes by removing the lead 0. Calling across areas still requires dialing trunk prefix 8 and waiting for dialtone after that. This pause was initially required by the analog trunk switches to identify the caller from PSTN for billing purposes.
 
When calling within Belarus, the trunk prefix must be followed by 0. In 2003, the abbreviated dialling within a single area code was replaced with a full 9-digit number + 2-digit trunk prefix. Previously it was possible to dial 82RRnn-nnn to reach a number in the same area. Now it is required to dial 80~AARRnn-nnn where AA is the area code, RR is the region code and nn-nnn is the local number.

International calling remains unchanged: 8~10-xxx...xxxx where 8 is a trunk prefix, 10 is the international access code, xxx...xxxx are the digits of the destination country, areas and local number.

New numbering plan 
Beltelecom began transition to the international numbering standard similar to the one adapted in many European countries in 2007. March 31, 2007 all short numbers were changed from 2 or 3 digits to 3 digits starting with 1.

Beltelecom plans to change trunk prefix to 0 from current 8~0 and international prefix to 00 from current 8~10.

Structure of international telephone numbers

Allocation of the area codes
13 – Restricted and directory services

14 – Restricted and directory services

15 – Grodno

16 – Brest

17 – Minsk

18 – Restricted and reference services

20 – Digital PSTN 1

21 – Vitebsk

22 – Mogilev

23 – Gomel

24 – Digital PSTN 2

25 – Mobile phone operator life:) Belarus

29 – Mobile phone operators – common code for all mobile phone operators except "Life :)"

33 – Mobile phone operator MTS Belarus

44 – Mobile phone operator A1

List of area codes in Belarus

Special trunk numbers
All special numbers are dialled with a trunk prefix 8.

600 100 – dial-up Internet access billed on local phone bill

601 – Personal radio communications

604 – Network of Presidential Administration

602 – Audiotext services

606 100 1111 – Prepaid card internet service

800 – Toll-free Direct Call

801 – Toll-free directory services "Green number"

803 – Toll-free surveys

805 – Interactive platform services

810 – Toll surveys

820 – International toll-free service IFS

902 – Toll directory assistance

Emergency and special services
The top 4 numbers are available across areas. Following numbers may be valid for Minsk only and may not exist or have a different short number in other areas.

Some of these numbers were formed by changing from old 2-digit codes to 3 by adding leading 1 or by replacing 0 with 1 in the old 3-digit code.

101 and 112 – Fire brigade

102 – Police

103 – Ambulance

104 – Gas leaks

105, 151, 155 – Railroad station

106 – National airport Minsk-2

107, 116 – Towing services

109 – Local toll directory assistance. Full number for dialling outside the local area it is 99-009-11 in the area centres (cities). Regional directory assistance numbers follow patterns RR-22-222 or RR-21-222 or RR-55-222 where RR is the region code within the area.

114 – Bus station

107, 135, 152 – Taxi

150 – A1 call centre

153 – Area code directory

175 – Currency exchange rates

176 – Interactive platform services

177 – Info service

168 – Minsk information service

169 – Pharmacy inventory and directory

185 – Infoline

188 – Time service

191 – Films on show in cinemas

192 – Night club directory

193 – 24 hour grocery store directory

194 – Horoscope

195 – Weather forecast

196 – Recorded fables

197 – Religious birthdays

The following short numbers in Minsk and other areas were discontinued or replaced with full local numbers:

088 – Time service, changed to 188

067 – Taxi, changed to 135

069 – Pharmacy inventory, changed to 169

053 – Area code directory, changed to 153

Digital PSTN exchanges in Minsk utilizing Touch-Tone dialling support some additional codes:

Flash – Three-way calling

*69 – Call return

See also
 Telecommunications in Belarus#Telephone system

References

External links
 Telephone codes in Belarus
 Beltelecom official site
 Minsk telephone directory and services
 Minsk telephone directory

Belarus
Telecommunications in Belarus
Telephone numbers